Josef Tuusi Motzfeldt (born 24 November 1941) is a Greenlandic politician of Inuit and German descent. He served as Minister for Finance and Foreign Affairs in the Greenland government of 2009–2013. During his political career, Motzfeldt had been president of the West Nordic Council, a member of the Parliament of Greenland, leader of the Inuit Ataqatigiit party and the Chairman of Parliament. His daughter is Nukâka Coster-Waldau, a Greenlandic singer and actress.

See also
Parliament of Greenland
Politics of Greenland

References

External links
NANOQ profile
Nordic Council web site
Josef Motzfeldt CV, ia.gl

Living people
Inuit Ataqatigiit politicians
Government ministers of Greenland
Chairmen of the Parliament of Greenland
Greenlandic socialists
Greenlandic Inuit people
Greenlandic people of German descent
People from Qaqortoq
1941 births